The Moplah sword is a sword used by the Muslim population in the Malabar Coast in southwestern India.

The Moplah sword has been used since the 17th Century, both as a weapon and a tool. 

The Moplah sword has a light, wide and double-edged blade which is broader near to the tip, and runs slightly concave. The blade is polished smooth, with no hollow-ground. In some versions, the blade has a strong middle section, which extends up into the tip. 

The hilt is made of carved wood, horn or bone. The pommel is often covered with a metal disk. At the transition between the blade and hilt, decorations are often found, of traditional or religious significance in most cases.

The blades are about 35 cm long, at the widest point about 10 cm wide and the sword has a total length of about 60 cm. 

The sword was without a scabbard, being held in a wide belt worn on the back

References 

 Stone, G.C., LaRocca, D.J. (1999) A Glossary of the Construction, Decoration and Use of Arms and Armor: in All Countries and in All Times.  Courier Dover Publications 
 Egerton, W.E. (2002) Indian and Oriental Armour. Courier Dover Publications 
 Indian Museum (2002) Indian and Oriental Arms and Armour. Courier Dover Publications 
 Elgood, R. (1994) The Arms and Armour of Arabia in the 18th-19th and 20th centuries. Scolar Press 

Blade weapons
Indian swords
Mappilas
History of Kerala